The Bird & Bottle Inn, formerly named Warren's Tavern, is a historic inn located in Garrison, New York. It is situated at the intersection of Old Albany Post Road and Indian Brook Road, midway between New York City and Albany, New York.

History
The inn was established in 1761 by Samuel Warren, who converted his home into a stage coach stop initially named “Warren’s Stop” for those traveling by stage coach from New York City to Albany.  Established fifteen years before the start of American Revolution, Warren's Tavern changed hands to Warren's son-in-law, Absalom Nelson, when he married Esther Warren at the beginning of the conflict in 1776. The renamed Nelson's Tavern became a favorite watering hole for both Continental and British soldiers during the Revolution. It was ultimately seized by the Continental Army, which used it as a regional headquarters. 

The tavern closed in 1832, and was reborn as the Bird and Bottle in 1940. The "Bird" part of the Inn's name is a reference to the wild pheasant that were prevalent in the area. Later in the 60s, the Bird and Bottle was purchased by Skitch Henderson, Johnny Carson’s band leader. Mr. Henderson would visit the inn quite frequently.

References 

Putnam County, New York
Stagecoach stops